Eucyanoides is a monotypic moth genus in the subfamily Arctiinae. Its single species, Eucyanoides investigatorum, is found in Panama. Both the genus and species were first described by Hervé de Toulgoët in 1988.

References

Arctiinae
Arctiinae of South America